Pierre Guillaume (11 August 1925 – 3 December 2002, also known as "'Commandant' Pierre Guillaume") was an officer of the French Navy. He took part in the Algiers putsch of 1961 and in the Organisation armée secrète, which opposed what it regarded as De Gaulle's treacherous abandonment of Algeria to the FLN terrorists.

Biography

Born to a divisional General of the French Army, Pierre Guillaume graduated from the École Navale in 1948. During the First Indochina War, he was officer in an assault naval division (Dinassaut). In 1954, he was promoted to lieutenant de vaisseau. He attempted to sail to France on a junk named Le Manohara but ran aground on the coasts of Somalia on 13 November 1956.

In late 1956, Guillaume reached Paris where he learned of the death of his brother, Jean-Marie Guillaume, a paratroop lieutenant killed in the Algerian War. He requested and was granted a transfer to the Army, and took his brother's office, from 14 July 1957 to 12 March 1958. During the Algiers putsch of 1961, he was naval counselor to general Challe. After the putsch attempt failed, he was sentenced to 4 years of imprisonment. He joined the Organisation armée secrète, was arrested in May 1962, and sentenced to 12 years of imprisonment in Tulle prison.

He later worked as a naval security consultant in Saudi Arabia and took part in operations with Bob Denard in Comoros. He also fought for the Karen in Myanmar.

He eventually took on living aboard a sailship, the Agathe, moored in Saint-Malo harbour. He worked for Radio Courtoisie almost until he died. Guillaume was a close friend of Jean-Marie Le Pen and interviewed him in several occasions for the radio.

In Popular Culture

After his death, his memoirs were published under the title Mon âme à Dieu, mon corps à la Patrie, mon honneur à moi ("My soul for God, my body for the Fatherland, my honour to myself").

Guillaume inspired the character of the "Drummer Crab" in the novel Le Crabe-tambour and the eponymous film by Pierre Schoendoerffer.

Notes and references 

1925 births
2002 deaths
French military personnel of the First Indochina War
French Navy officers from Saint-Malo
Far-right politics in France
Members of the Organisation armée secrète